WGLI (98.7 FM) is an active rock formatted broadcast radio station licensed to Hancock, Michigan, serving the Keweenaw Peninsula.  WGLI is owned and operated by Keweenaw Bay Indian Community.

Coverage and Programming
Primarily serving the Keweenaw Bay Indian Community and the Keweenaw Peninsula at 100,000 watts.

References

External links
98.7 The Rockin' Eagle Online

2003 establishments in Michigan
Active rock radio stations in the United States
Radio stations established in 2003
GLI
Native American radio
Ojibwe culture